Lophoceramica is a genus of moths of the family Noctuidae.

Species
 Lophoceramica artega (Barnes, 1907)
 Lophoceramica pyrrha (Druce, 1894)
 Lophoceramica simplicifacta Dyar, 1918

References
Natural History Museum Lepidoptera genus database
Lophoceramica at funet

Hadeninae